Sayyid Jani Shah, also called Baba Jaani Shah,  was a Muslim Pir who accepted the Sikh Dharma after having religious discourses with Guru Har Gobind. According to Sri Gurpartap Suraj Granth he was from lineage of Muhammad.

The resting place of Jani Shah is present in Sri Hargobindpur city, in Gurdwara Damdama Sahib just across the pond, where presently Guru Granth Sahib is installed.

References

History of Sikhism
Converts to Sikhism